Other World Computing (OWC) is an American computer hardware company and online store for upgrading Mac and accessories. MacSales.com was founded in 1988. It also goes by the domain name www.owcdigital.com

History

1980s
In 1988, at age 14, Larry O'Connor began LRO Enterprises, a printer ribbon re-inking business, in his family's barn. A year later, LRO Enterprises reorganized into LRO Computer Sales and began selling computer memory chips via America Online. The company moved into its first facility in Woodstock, Illinois, and hired its first employees.

1990s
In 1992, LRO Computer Sales shifted focus to computers by offering hard drives to its customers. In 1993, LRO Computer Sales incorporated in the state of Illinois under the name New Concepts Development Corporation (NCDC). The company then moved into a 2,500-square-foot office space, which expanded to about 6,500-square feet over the next eight years. In 1994, O'Connor renamed LRO Computers Sales "Other World Computing" (OWC), which operates doing business as NCDC. OWC shipped its first OWC-branded acceleration products in 1995 followed by the introduction of the Mercury G3 ZIF upgrade line in 1999.

2000s
OWC expanded and introduced the Mercury Classic Elite line of external storage and offered an iPod case. OWC announced a portable FireWire drive and a FireWire/USB combination product in 2003.

Later on, OWC launched www.fastermac.net, a Macintosh-only Internet access service that provided dial-up access throughout the U.S. specifically for Macintosh computer users in 2003.

In 2004, the company also began offering an iPod battery replacement program and introduced the miniStack line of drives to complement Apple's Mac mini. In 2006, OWC introduced the first Dual-HD external FireWire drive RAID available up to 1.5 TB and became the first third party company with memory modules and upgrade kits for the Intel-based Mac Pro. It met Apple specifications and was the first to introduce a Quad Interface external hard drive combining FireWire 800, FireWire 400, USB 2.0, and eSATA connection options in one product – the OWC Mercury Elite-AL Pro Quad Interface.

In January 2007, OWC announced it would be the US distributor of the Axiotron Modbook.
OWC also introduced the OWC Mercury Rack Pro line and the OWC Blu-ray internal and external drives. In April 2009, OWC expanded its storage line with the OWC Mercury Elite Pro Qx2, a desktop hardware RAID storage product.

In 2008, OWC moved into a new  corporate headquarters designed to platinum Leadership in Energy and Environmental Design standards.

In October 2009, a Vestas V39-500 kW wind turbine started generating more electricity than OWC needed to run the facility.  OWC said it was the first technology manufacturer/distributor in the U.S. to become totally on-site wind powered.

2010s
Other World Computing was on the Inc. magazine 5000 "Fastest-Growing Privately Owned Companies" and "Computer and Electronics Top 100" list from 2007 through 2013.
In 2010, OWC announced the Mercury Extreme SSD line of 2.5" SATA solid state drives. The OWC Data Doubler, for adding a second internal drive to MacBook, MacBook Pro, Mac mini, and iMac computers was also introduced as was the OWC Slim eSATA ExpressCard Adapter, which adds an eSATA port to Mac and PC notebooks.

In 2011, sales revenue was reported as $88.3 million with about 137 employees.

In January 2019, OWC acquired fellow external computer storage products and accessories manufacturer Akitio.

Solar Power 
OWC adopted solar power as an energy source at its two largest locations in Woodstock and Austin, TX. The Woodstock, IL, solar system will generate 265,000 kWh per year, when combined with power from the wind turbine it brings the Woodstock headquarters’ total alternative power generation capacity to over one million kilowatts. It also means that over the course of a year, OWC produces more power than it consumes.

A similar but smaller array is on the roof of OWC's Austin, TX, building. Energized at the beginning of 2014, 160 solar panels generate approximately one-third of the power consumed by the three-story building, including the majority of power that is consumed by OWC.

Products

OWC markets upgrade kits for iMac, Macbook Pro, Macbook Air, Mac mini, MacBook and Mac Pro.
The Data-Doubler installation kit allows customers to add a second 2.5" SATA hard disk drive or solid state drive to the optical drive bay of a Mac mini, MacBook, MacBook Pro or an iMac.  The optical drive can then be repurposed as an external drive.
OWC designs and manufactures solid state drives.
MaxRAM is a line of memory upgrades for Apple products.

References

External links
macsales.com
OWC.com

Computer hardware companies
Companies established in 1988
Companies based in Illinois